Patvakan Barkhudaryan was Armenian film director and People's Artist of the Armenian SSR (1940)

Filmography
The Savur Grave (1926) (as actor)
Evil Spirit (1927)
Funeral of A. Spendiarov (1928)
Five Right in the Target (1928)
The Sixteenth (1928)
Under the Black Wing (1930)
Kikos (1931)
Two Nights (1932)
Kurds-Yezids (1932)
A Child of Sun (1933)
Mountain Stream (1939)
Armenian Film-Concert (1941)
The Guardsman's Wife (1943) 
Second Armenian Film-Concert (1946)

References

External links

Armenian film directors
1898 births
1948 deaths
People from Stepanavan
People's Artists of Armenia